Württemberg is a historical German territory roughly corresponding to Swabia.

Württemberg  or Württemberger may also refer to:

Places

County of Württemberg (1083–1495), a county of the Holy Roman Empire
Duchy of Württemberg (1495–1803), a duchy of the Holy Roman Empire
Electorate of Württemberg (1803–1806), an electorate of the Holy Roman Empire
Kingdom of Württemberg (1806–1918), a kingdom of the Confederation of the Rhine and the German Confederation
Free People's State of Württemberg (1918–1945), part of the Weimar Republic and Nazi Germany
Württemberg-Baden (1945–1952), a state of the Federal Republic of Germany
Württemberg-Hohenzollern (1945–1952), a West German state created in 1945
Baden-Württemberg (beginning 1952), a state in southwest Germany

Other uses
Württemberg (hill), Stuttgart, Germany
Württemberg (wine region)
Württemberg Cup, a regional cup competition of German football
House of Württemberg, a German royal family and dynasty
List of rulers of Württemberg, the former ruling House of Württemberg (kingdom abolished 1918)
Württemberger, a breed of horse
Württemberger or Merinolandschaf, a breed of sheep
SMS Württemberg, two ships of the Imperial German Navy
German trawler V 307 Württemberg, a Second World War vorpostenboot